Founded by Dr. Naim Anwar Muzzafar, the Pakistan Pharmacists Association (PPA) is the national professional body of pharmacists and pharmacy students in Pakistan. It has a mission to promote and expand the profession of pharmacy and the role of pharmacists. The association is dedicated to improving public health and patient care by enhancing professional development of the pharmacists along with Pharmacy Council of Pakistan.

Objectives
To promote the pharmacy as a component of the healthcare team
To contribute to education programs for pharmacists already engaged in the practice to improve the medication use and health outcomes of patients
To promote high standards of professional conduct amongst pharmacists
To provide leadership in the identification, development, and implementation of health policies of concern to pharmacy
To hold seminars, symposia, exhibitions, and conferences

Conferences
 Organized four international conferences during the last tenure, two in Karachi and the other two in Lahore
 Organized 13th international pharmaceutical conference and exhibition in April 2006 at Lahore
 Organized 14th international pharmaceutical conference and exhibition in 2007 at Karachi
 Organized 15th international pharmaceutical conference and exhibition in April 2008 at Lahore
 Organized 16th international pharmaceutical conference and exhibition in April 2016 at Lahore

Memberships
 Member of the Commonwealth Pharmacist Association (CPA) and Federation of Asian Pharmacists Association (FAPA)
 Elected regional representative of Asia in CPA

Disaster help
 Camps for the help of earthquake victim and Internally Displaced Persons (IDPs) within 24 hours of the emergencies
 Formed a natural disaster committee which received contributions and provided aid to the earthquake disaster victims

External links
PPA official website
https://masoodstore.com.pk/
https://masood.com.pk/

Pharmacy organisations in Pakistan
Pharmacy-related professional associations